During the 2001–02 English football season, Crystal Palace F.C. competed in the Football League First Division.

Season summary
Palace turned to Steve Bruce for the 2001–02 season. A good start to the season gave Palace hope for a promotion challenge, but Bruce attempted to walk out on the club after just four months at the helm to take charge of Birmingham City. After a short spell on 'gardening leave', Bruce was eventually allowed to join Birmingham City, succeeded by Trevor Francis, who had ironically been his predecessor at Birmingham.

Final league table

Results
Crystal Palace's score comes first

Legend

Football League First Division

FA Cup

League Cup

Players

First-team squad
Squad at end of season

Left club during season

Reserve squad

References

Notes

Crystal Palace F.C. seasons
Crystal Palace